Ivory Coast is a multilingual country with an estimated 78 languages currently spoken.

The official language, French, was introduced during the colonial period. This language is taught in schools and serves as a lingua franca in the country, along with Dioula.

The seventy or so indigenous languages fall into five main branches of the Niger–Congo family. In the southeastern quadrant are Kwa languages, some such as Baoulé and Anyin (2–3 million and 1 million speakers) part of a dialect continuum with Akan in Ghana, others such as Attié (or Akyé) (half a million) more divergent. Baoulé is spoken east of Lake Kossou and at the capital Yamoussoukro, and Anyi along the Ghanaian border. In the southwestern quadrant are Kru languages, such as Bete and We (Gure/Wobe), half a million apiece, and Dida (a quarter million), related to the languages of Liberia. In the northwest, along the Guinean border and across to Lake Kossou in the center of the country, are Mande languages, such as Dan (1 million speakers) and Guro (half a million, on the lake). The lake and the river Bandama divide the Kwa east of the country from the Kru and Mande west. Across the center north are various Senufo languages, such as Senari (1 million speakers). In the northeast corner, surrounding Comoé National Park, are a quarter million speakers each of Kulango, the Gur language Lobi, and the Mande language Jula, which is a lingua franca of neighboring Burkina Faso.

There are also three million or so speakers of immigrant languages, mostly from neighboring countries and above all from Burkina Faso. Ethnic tensions in the north between immigrant and native Ivoirians, as well as between the Mande/Senoufo north and the Kru/Kwa south, were a large factor in the Ivorian civil wars.

Education for the deaf in Ivory Coast uses American Sign Language, introduced by the deaf American missionary Andrew Foster.

References

General
 Ethnologue list and map for Ivory Coast
 PanAfrican L10n page on Ivory Coast 
  Linguistic situation in Ivory Coast

Notes

See also 
 African French

 
Ivorian culture
Society of Ivory Coast